The 2nd Asian Beach Games were held in Muscat, Oman from 8 December 2010 to 16 December 2010. The opening ceremony was held in the Al-Musannah Sports City, Muscat.

Emblem
The relation between the Omani people and the sea is legendary. Throughout history, they were pioneers in crossing the seas and oceans, and played a significant role in the maritime and shipbuilding history. The 8th century witnessed the arrival of the vessel "Sohar" to the City of Canton (China), establishing once more the Omani maritime supremacy.

The logo design is derived from such splendid historical inputs, by embodying the simplest forms of the elements. The logo reflects the relation between the people of Oman and the rest of the worlds, especially with the people of Asia, by hosting the shining sun of Asia in Muscat, projecting a better future for the Asian sports, aided by the ship that will carry it to its international and continental sports destinations.

The strong and high waves under the sail provide the logo with solidity, vitality and sustainability and challenges, as represented by the flood of competitors in the various games, hosted in the high seas, and at the same time, touching the attractive Omani beaches, giving the local dimension of the nature of the beach games' tournament.

The expressions under the beach are colored by the bright colors of the Omani flag, expressing the devotion of the Omani people to their deep-rooted customs and traditions, expressed in the complete harmony of the elements.

Development

Omran (Omani Government owned tourism company) developed the dedicated 100 Hectare Site at Wudam Al Sahil near Muscat to host the 2010 Asian Beach Games. The development comprised a mixture of temporary and permanent facilities such as a hotel for media and guests, an athletes' village, administration building, press and media centre, restaurants and recreational facilities, site wide infrastructure including a marina and adequate parking facilities. Associated with the above-mentioned development, dedicated playing pitches with temporary stands to accommodate around 300 spectators for preliminary events and up to 1,500 spectators for the final event were built. Further to this, the opening and closing ceremonies were held in the amphitheatre for up to 5,000 spectators.

Key Features:

 4-star hotel
 Accommodation for Media and Administrative Staff.
 Press Centre, restaurant and recreation facilities within the Athlete village.
 Media Centre with special conference facilities, studios, internet facilities, restaurants, etc.
 Playing grounds for various sports activities with stands to accommodate 4000 – 5000 spectators.
 A marina used for docking 400 sailboats and for various training purposes.
 A central drop-off and vehicle parking area including shuttle buses for the event.
 Future aquatic based resort development.

Sports

Participating nations 
43 out of 45 Asian countries participated in these games. The only exception being North Korea and Macau. According to the Games' official website, Kuwaiti athletes participated the Games under the Olympic flag because the Kuwait Olympic Committee was suspended due to political interference in January 2010

Calendar

Medal table

Thailand led the medal table with 14 gold medals and total of 36 medals. 27 NOCs won at least a single medal with 14 NOCs winning at least a single gold medal, thus leaving 16 NOCs failing to win any medal at the Games.

References

Medal Table

External links
OCA Asian Beach Games web page
Official Website

 
Asian Beach Games
Asian Beach Games
Asian Beach Games, 2010
Asian Beach Games
A
2010 in Asian sport
Multi-sport events in Oman